Dragon Mania Legends is a 2015 casual mobile game developed and published by Gameloft. It was released on January 8, 2015 for iOS and Android. It was later released for Windows Phone and Microsoft Windows.

Gameplay
The game takes place in a fictional world called Dragolandia, and it features Vikings. The game opens with the ability for the player to build dragon habitats on one island, with others available for purchase through in-game currency. Currency in-game are coins and the premium currency is gems. The game does include in-app purchases and bonus promotion videos.

There are many dragons, each one with an affiliated element or elements.
Players begin Dragon Mania Legends with one dragon, a level 1 Fire dragon, but can recruit more dragons through leveling up, completing quests and events, obtaining card packs, purchasing them, or breeding them.
Players can upgrade their dragons by feeding them, obtaining dragon food on farms and as rewards. Feed production, breeding, and other tasks take time to complete, but players can speed up processes by spending premium currency. 

Players spend energy to enter turn-based battles on a campaign map with battles seeing players drag a dragon's element on top of an enemy to attack. This begins a meter, and players are challenged with tapping when the meter is in either the gray (normal attack) or green (perfect attack) areas. If players stop the meter in the red area, their attack misses.

Battles continue until all enemy units have been defeated, and players earn rewards like experience points and dragon food after each victory. Players can spend premium currency on a VIP upgrade to unlock additional rewards after these battles. VIPs also have the ability to complete more battles before waiting for their energy to recharge, and can participate in VIP-only events. VIP accounts aren't permanent, but rather last for a limited amount of time, in relation to their cost.

In addition to the game's single-player story mode, gamers can enter the Arena to face off against other players for exclusive rewards. The players can login with Facebook to receive various bonuses. 

There are 6 structures named ruins on the various islands that can be purchasers and explored; The Mystic Cave, Ghost Ship, Wildfire Marsh, Skull Gate, Ancient's Palace, and Magma's Lair. These structures can be purchased with in-game currency. Each structure gives the player rewards and seals through exploring. When the player explores, each ruin offers three shards that make up one seal. After forging the seal, it gives the player a brief speed up of in-game timers. After unlocking each of the six seals, a dragon called Chronos appears on top of the Mystic Cave, giving the player the ability to speed up timers.

References

2015 video games
IOS games
Android (operating system) games
Gameloft games
Windows Phone games
Windows games
Universal Windows Platform apps
Video games developed in France
Video games about dragons